Jalapa is an unincorporated community and census-designated place (CDP) in Pleasant Township, Grant County, Indiana, United States. As of the 2010 census it had a population of 171. The site of the Battle of the Mississinewa, fought during the War of 1812, is nearby.

History
The first post office in Jalapa, called "Dallas", operated from 1848 until 1849. The post office was renamed "Jalapa" in 1849, and remained in operation until it was discontinued in 1900. The community was named after Jalapa, in Mexico.

Geography

Demographics

References

Census-designated places in Grant County, Indiana
Census-designated places in Indiana